Eagle Point may refer to either of two communities in the U.S. state of Pennsylvania:

Eagle Point, Berks County, Pennsylvania
Eagle Point, Lehigh County, Pennsylvania